The North Gloucestershire Combination Senior Cup is an annual rugby union knock-out club competition organised by the North Gloucestershire Combination – one of the five bodies that make up the Gloucestershire Rugby Football Union.  It was first introduced during the 1903–04 season, with the inaugural winners being Berkley and is the most important rugby union competition in north Gloucestershire, ahead of the Junior Cup and Glanville Cup.

The Senior Cup is currently open for clubs sides based in Gloucester and north Gloucestershire, playing all the way from tier 5 (National League 3 South West) to tier 11 (Gloucester 3) of the English rugby union league system. The format is a knockout cup with a first round, quarter-finals, semi-finals and a final to be held at Kingsholm in Gloucester in April–May alongside the Junior and Glanville Cup finals.

North Gloucestershire Combination Senior Cup winners

Number of wins
Matson (29)
Coney Hill (17)
Gordon League (16)
St Marks (6)
Spartans (5)
Widden Old Boys (5)
Old Centralians (4)
Tredworth (4)
West End (4)
Atlas Works (2)
Gloucester Old Boys (2)
South End (2)
Berkley (1)
Bream (1)
Longlevens (1)
Whitecroft (1)

Notes

See also
 North Gloucestershire Combination
 Gloucestershire RFU
 North Gloucestershire Combination Junior Cup
 North Gloucestershire Combination Glanville Cup
 English rugby union system
 Rugby union in England

References

External links
 North Gloucester Combination
 Gloucestershire RFU

Recurring sporting events established in 1903
1903 establishments in England
Rugby union cup competitions in England
Rugby union in Gloucestershire